Andrea Dew Steele is an American activist who co-founded Emerge California in 2002,  and founded Emerge America in 2005 which now has affiliates in 27 different states of the U.S., with the goal of having an affiliate in all 50 states by 2020. The goal of Emerge affiliates is to increase the number of Democratic women in all areas of the government. Steele spent her career in Democratic activism and has been a director at Human Rights Watch. She is also a regular contributor to the Huffington Post.

Biography 
Steele earned a Political Science B.A. at Tufts University and an International History M.A. from the London School of Economics.Steele was a policy analyst for several years in Washington D.C. on Capitol Hill, where she helped fundraise for Democratic causes and candidates. Steele was friends with Kamala Harris and helped her in her first race for District Attorney. She moved to the San Francisco Bay Area and spent 8 years as advisor to Democratic activist and Esprit Clothing co-founder Susie Tompkins Buell. 

Steele co-founded Emerge California in 2002, which uses classes and training programs to prepare Democratic women in northern California to successfully run for office. In 2005, Steele founded Emerge America, a national umbrella organization, and continues to open Emerge affiliates in more states. Steele's short-term goal with Emerge America is to achieve 30% representation of women in politics, as she believes that achieves a critical mass for change. Although the population is 52% women, less than a quarter of government officials are women. In addition to writing for publications such as the Huffington Post, Steele has appeared on television and radio, including Al Jazeera America and MSNBC to discuss campaigns, current events and politics. She has been a director for Human Rights Watch.

References 

Year of birth missing (living people)
Living people
American political activists
Tufts University School of Arts and Sciences alumni
Alumni of the London School of Economics